Golfito Airport  is an airport serving Golfito, a port town on the northwest end of Golfito Bay, an inlet off the Gulf of Dulce in the Puntarenas Province of Costa Rica. The airport is owned and managed by the country's Directorate General of Civil Aviation (DGAC).

The airport is in a narrow valley running inland from the bay, with high terrain on both sides of the runway, and high terrain immediately off the northwest end.

Airlines and destinations

Passenger Statistics
Golfito Airport is eighth-busiest in the country by passenger traffic. These data show number of passengers movements into the airport, according to the Directorate General of Civil Aviation of Costa Rica's Statistical Yearbooks.

See also
Transport in Costa Rica
List of airports in Costa Rica

References

External links
OurAirports - Golfito Airport
Golfito Domestic Airport

Airports in Costa Rica
Buildings and structures in Puntarenas Province